The Anglican Diocese of The Murray is located in the south-eastern region of South Australia. Founded in 1970 as part of the Province of South Australia, it takes in the Fleurieu Peninsula, Riverland, Adelaide Hills, Murraylands and the southern suburbs of Adelaide. In 2011 the diocese had 22 parishes or pastoral districts. The cathedral church of the diocese is the Cathedral of St John the Baptist, Murray Bridge. The current bishop is Keith Dalby who was enthroned in June 2019.

Structure and churchmanship 
In 2011 the diocese had 22 parishes or pastoral districts. The cathedral church of the diocese is the Cathedral of St John the Baptist, Murray Bridge.

The Diocese of The Murray is a traditionalist Anglo-Catholic diocese which does not ordain women to the priesthood. It was the last diocese in the Anglican Church of Australia to admit women to the diaconate, ordaining Margaret Holt as deacon in April 2017.

Ross Davies relinquished the position of bishop in September 2010 and was received into the Roman Catholic Church. John Ford, the Bishop suffragan of Plymouth in the Church of England's Diocese of Exeter, was installed as the new bishop on 6 December 2013. He retired in May 2019 and the Reverend Keith Dalby was elected as his successor.

Bishops of The Murray

References

External links 
 Official website

Murray
Anglican Church of Australia Ecclesiastical Province of South Australia
Anglo-Catholicism